James Melville or Melvill may refer to:

 James Melville (Scottish minister) (1556–1614),  Scottish divine and reformer
 James Melville of Halhill (1535–1617),  Scottish diplomat and memoir writer
 James Melville (politician) (1885–1931), British Labour Party Member of Parliament for Gateshead 1929–1931
 James Melville (author) (1931–2014), pseudonym of British author Roy Peter Martin
 James Melville (cricketer, born 1909) (1909–1961), English cricketer for Warwickshire
 James Melville (cricketer, born 1936) (1936–2016), English cricketer for Kent
 James Cosmo Melvill (1792–1861), British administrator of the East India Company
 James Cosmo Melvill (naturalist) (1845–1929), British botanist and malacologist
 James D. Melville Jr. (born 1957), American statesman

See also
 Melville (name)